Harry Yates (26 September 1925 – 26 November 1987) was a professional footballer who played as an inside forward for Huddersfield Town, Darlington, Headington United, Bedford Town and Nuneaton Borough.

He was born in Huddersfield in 1925 and died in Liverpool in 1987 at the age of 62.

References

1925 births
1987 deaths
Footballers from Huddersfield
English footballers
Association football inside forwards
Huddersfield Town A.F.C. players
Darlington F.C. players
Oxford United F.C. players
Bedford Town F.C. players
Nuneaton Borough F.C. players
English Football League players
Southern Football League players